is a ski resort located on Mount Karamatsu in Hakuba, Japan. For the 1998 Winter Olympics in Nagano, it hosted the alpine skiing downhill, super giant slalom, and combined slalom events.

Happoone receives an average snowfall of 11 metres per season. Happoone is higher than all other ski resorts resulting in quality snow but leaves you exposed to the climate and weather conditions.

The resort was constructed in 1958. In the lead-up to the 1998 Games, a test event was held in February 1996 that led to complaints by skiers to the International Ski Federation (FIS) that the  course for men's downhill was too short. NAOC refused on its promise of environmental stewardship despite the fact that FIS pointed out that 600,000 recreational skiers a year competed in that special zone and asked why elite skiers could not compete in the same area. In November 1997, the issue was resolved between the FIS and NAOC by adding an extra  to the run. This was in follow-up to the FIS threatening not to run the event for the Games if the course length issue was not resolved. Course designer Bernhard Russi of Switzerland, the 1972 Winter Olympic champion in the alpine skiing downhill event, agreed to this.

References

1998 Winter Olympics official report. Volume 2. pp. 186–90.
Wallechinsky, David and Jaime Locuky (2009). "Alpine Skiing, Men: Downhill". In The Complete Book of the Winter Olympics: 2010 Edition. London: Aurum Press Limited. pp. 189–90.

External links

Official website

Venues of the 1998 Winter Olympics
Olympic alpine skiing venues
Ski areas and resorts in Japan
Sports venues in Nagano Prefecture
Hakuba, Nagano